Lufkin Air Force Station (ADC ID: TM-193) is a closed United States Air Force General Surveillance Radar station. It was closed in 1961.

History
Lufkin Air Force Station came into existence as part of Phase III of the Air Defense Command Mobile Radar program. On October 20, 1953 ADC requested a third phase of twenty-five radar sites be constructed.

The 815th Aircraft Control and Warning Squadron was moved to Lufkin AFS on 14 February 1957.  It began operating an AN/FPS-3A search radar and an AN/FPS-6 height-finder radar, and initially the station functioned as a Ground-Control Intercept (GCI) and warning station.  As a GCI station, the squadron's role was to guide interceptor aircraft toward unidentified intruders picked up on the unit's radar scopes.

The Air Force inactivated Lufkin on 1 June 1961 due to budgetary constraints.  The site is now home to one of the Texas state supported living centers.

Air Force units and assignments

Units
 Constituted as the 815th Aircraft Control and Warning Squadron
 Activated on 8 November 1956 at Oklahoma City AFS, OK (not equipped or manned)
 Moved to Lufkin AFS on 1 November 1957
 Discontinued and inactivated on 1 June 1961

Assignments
 33d Air Division, 1 November 1957
 Oklahoma City Air Defense Sector, 1 Jan 1960 - 1 June 1961

See also
 List of USAF Aerospace Defense Command General Surveillance Radar Stations

References

 Cornett, Lloyd H. and Johnson, Mildred W., A Handbook of Aerospace Defense Organization  1946 - 1980,  Office of History, Aerospace Defense Center, Peterson AFB, CO (1980).
 Winkler, David F. & Webster, Julie L., Searching the Skies, The Legacy of the United States Cold War Defense Radar Program,  US Army Construction Engineering Research Laboratories, Champaign, IL (1997).
 Information for Lufkin AFS, TX

Installations of the United States Air Force in Texas
Radar stations of the United States Air Force
Aerospace Defense Command military installations
1957 establishments in Texas
1961 disestablishments in Texas
Military installations established in 1957
Military installations closed in 1961